The FC Basel 1937–38 season was the forty-fifth season since the club's foundation on 15 November 1893. FC Basel played their home games in the Landhof in the district Wettstein in Kleinbasel. Emil Junker was the club chairman and it was his second consecutive season as president.

Overview 
Fernand Jaccard who had taken over as first team coach during the previous season stayed on as player-manager this season. Basel played a total of 33 matches in their 1937–38 season. 22 of these matches were in the Nationalliga, three in the Swiss Cup and eight were friendly matches. Of these eight friendlies six were played at home in the Landhof, one in Espenmoos as guests to FC St. Gallen and one as guests to Le Havre AC in the north of France. Four of the friendlies were won, one was drawn and three ended with a defeat.

The number of teams in the 1937–38 Nationalliga was reduced by one team in comparison to the previous season. Thus 12 teams contested the championship this year, which was played as a round-robin, one team to be relegated and only one promoted from the two 1. Liga groups. Basel played an even and consistent season. 22 league games in total, 12 of them ended with a victory, three ended in a draw and the team suffered seven defeats. With 27 points Basel ended the season in fourth position, three points less than Lugano who became Swiss champions. 

The young forward Numa Monnard, who had transferred in at the beginning of the season from Cantonal Neuchatel, was the team's top goal scorer. With 20 goals he was the Nationalliga top scorer as well. He played 21 league games and in each of his first eight games he scored at least one goal. In the league match against Lausanne-Sport on 12 September 1937 he scored  a hat-trick as Basel won by four goals to nil. In total, including cup and friendlies, Monnard played 29 games for Basel, in which he netted 34 times.

In the 1st principal round of the Swiss Cup, as Basel played against lower tier FC Breite, Monard scored five times. In the next cup round Monard scored a hat-trick against Bellinzona. However, in the round of 16 Basel lost 0–1 against Grasshopper Club, who then proceeded and eventually won the cup.

Players 
The following is the list of the Basel first team squad during the season 1937–38. The list includes players that were in the squad the day the season started on 15 August 1937 but subsequently left the club after that date.

 
 

 

Players who left the squad

Results

Legend

Friendly matches

Pre- and mid-season

Winter break to end of season

Nationalliga

League matches

League table

Swiss Cup

See also 
 History of FC Basel
 List of FC Basel players
 List of FC Basel seasons

References

Sources 
 Rotblau: Jahrbuch Saison 2014/2015. Publisher: FC Basel Marketing AG. 
 Die ersten 125 Jahre. Publisher: Josef Zindel im Friedrich Reinhardt Verlag, Basel. 
 FCB team 1937/38 at fcb-archiv.ch
 Switzerland 1937/38 by Erik Garin at Rec.Sport.Soccer Statistics Foundation

External links
 FC Basel official site

FC Basel seasons
Basel